Golesh is a mountain in central Kosovo,  high, near the town of Kosovo Polje and Pristina International Airport Adem Jashari. A branch of the Drenica River originates on the mountain. On the top, there is an FM-/TV-broadcasting centre.

References

Mountains of Kosovo